The Świna (Pomeranian: Swina) is a channel in northwest Poland, between 2 and 4 km from the German border. It flows from Szczecin Lagoon to the Baltic Sea between the islands of Uznam and Wolin. It is a part of the Oder estuary, and carries about 75% of that river's waterflow (of the remainder, Peenestrom carries 15% and Dziwna 10%). It has a length of about 16 km. Świnoujście is a major town on the  channel.

The German Empire dammed and deepened the straits from 1874-1880 to create the Kaiserfahrt (Piast canal). It connects the northern part of the Świna directly with the Szczecin Lagoon and the Pomeranian harbor of Szczecin (Stettin). The straits thus gained importance as a direct waterway to the industrial city. The territory along the straits' path was transferred from Germany to Poland following World War II.

Regressive Delta

The regressive delta was formed by the floods of Świna channel in the area of the Wolin National Park in 1996. This water-muddy natural complex forms an archipelago of 44 islands and canals with changing directions of water flow. The Delta Świna channel  was formed by the Scandinavian glacier that withdrew from this territory 12 thousand years ago. During the western and northern storms sea water flowed into Szczecin Lagoon, overflowing the islands. The borders of islands are constantly shaped during the process of accumulation.

References

See also
 Dziwna
 Peene

Rivers of Poland
Rivers of West Pomeranian Voivodeship
Straits of the Baltic Sea
0Świna